Ahmadlu may refer to:
 Ahmadlu, Minjavan
 Ahmadlu-ye Olya, Garamduz District
 Ahmadlu-ye Sofla, Garamduz District